Hyvönen is a Finnish surname. Notable people with the surname include:

Frida Hyvönen (born 1977), Swedish singer-songwriter
Juho Hyvönen (1891–1975), Finnish lawyer, civil servant and politician
Hannes Hyvönen (born 1975), Finnish ice hockey player
Tapani Hyvönen (born 1947), Finnish industrial designer

Finnish-language surnames